The Western North Region is one of the six new regions of Ghana created in 2019. The region is bounded by the Ivory Coast (Comoé District) on the west, the Central region in the southeast, and the Ashanti, Ahafo, Bono East and Bono regions in the north. The Western North Region has the highest rainfall in Ghana, lush green hills, and fertile soils. There are numerous small and large-scale gold mines companies in the region. The ethnic culture of the region is dominated by the Sefwis. The main languages spoken are Sefwi, Akan, French and English.

History 
The Western North Region of Ghana is a new region carved out of the existing Western Region of Ghana. This creation of this new region was in fulfillment of a promise made by the New Patriotic Party prior to the 2016 Ghana general election. Upon winning the elections, the President, Nana Akuffo Addo created the Ministry of Regional Reorganization to oversee policy formulation and implementation. In all, six new regions were created from the existing ten regions of Ghana. The other new regions are Bono East, Ahafo, Savannah, North East, and Oti regions.

The execution of plans for the creation of the regions was ceded to the newly created Ministry of Regional Reorganization and Development which is under the leadership of Hon. Dan Botwe. In March 2017, the ministry sent the blueprint for the creation of the region along with others to the Council of State. The council met over 36 times from the time of submission to August 2017.  The final stage for the creation of the region was decided through a referendum by the people within the area of the new region on 27 December 2018.

Tourism
The region has several forest reserves which serve as tourist attractions.

Education
The Western North region has many post-secondary schools, including teachers' and nursing colleges.

Health 
In August 2021, the region recorded an outbreak of H5N1 avian influenza.

Administrative divisions
The political administration of the region is through the local government system. Under this administration system, the region is divided into nine MMDA's (made up of 0 Metropolitan, 3 Municipal and 6 Ordinary Assemblies). Each District, Municipal or Metropolitan Assembly, is administered by a Chief Executive, representing the central government but deriving authority from an Assembly headed by a presiding member elected from among the members themselves. The current list is as follows:

References 

 
Regions of Ghana
2018 in Ghana
French-speaking countries and territories
States and territories established in 2019